Say No More may refer to:

 Say No More (band), an American rock band
 a catchphrase of the Monty Python sketch Nudge Nudge

Albums 
 Say No More (Badfinger album), 1981
 Say No More (Clay Walker album), 2001
 Say No More (House of Heroes album), 2006
 Say No More (Linda Lewis album), 1971
 Say No More (Bob Ostertag album)
 Say No More, a 1996 album by Charly García

Songs 
 "Say No More" (song), a 2001 song by Clay Walker
 "Say No More", by David Kitt from Not Fade Away
 "Say No More", by Innosense from So Together
 "Say No More", by Steelheart from Wait
 "Say No More", by Tyne-James Organ from Persevere